Asser is both a surname and a given name. Notable people with the name include:

Tobias Michael Carel Asser, winner of the Nobel Prize for Peace
Asser Rig Hvide, Danish nobleman, 1080-1151
Asser Mbai, a Namibian politician
Asser Thorkilsson (? - 1137), Archbishop of Lund

Danish masculine given names
Norwegian masculine given names
Scandinavian masculine given names

da:Asser
fr:Asser
nl:Asser
sv:Ascer